Gamerki may refer to the following places in Poland:

Gamerki Małe
Gamerki Wielkie